Nightboat Books is an American nonprofit literary press founded in 2004 and located in Brooklyn, New York. The press publishes poetry, fiction, essays, translations, and intergenre books.

History

The press was founded in 2004 by Kazim Ali and Jennifer Chapis. In 2007, Stephen Motika became publisher. Nightboat Books publishes manuscripts accepted through general submission and annually awards a $1,000 prize and publication for a book of poems.

Nightboat Books are distributed by Consortium Book Sales and Distribution.  The press has received support from the National Endowment for the Arts, the New York State Council on the Arts, the Jerome Foundation, the Fund for Poetry, and the Topanga Fund.

Notable authors published by Nightboat Books include Dawn Lundy Martin, Nathanaël, Joanne Kyger, Cole Swensen, Melissa Buzzeo, Daniel Borzutzky, Bhanu Kapil, Jill Magi, Wayne Koestenbaum, Etel Adnan, and Fanny Howe. Brian Blanchfield's book A Several World, published by Nightboat Books, was the 2014 recipient of the James Laughlin Award and was long-listed for the 2014 National Book Award. Brandon Som's Nightboat Books publication, The Tribute Horse, won the Kate Tufts Discovery Award for a debut book of poetry and was selected as a finalist for the 2015 PEN Center USA Literary Award for poetry. In 2013, Nightboat published Troubling the Line: Trans and Genderqueer Poetry and Poetics, the first comprehensive poetry collection by trans and genderqueer authors, which went on to be a finalist for the 2014 Lambda Literary Award in LGBT Anthologies.

Notable books 

Andrea Abi-Karam and Kay Gabriel's We Want It All: An Anthology of Radical Trans Poetics
Andrew Durbin's Skyland
Bernadette Mayer's The Desires of Mothers to Please Others in Letters
Bhanu Kapil's Ban en Banlieue
Bruce Boom's Bruce Boone Dismembered
Camille Roy's Honey Mine: Collected Stories
Dawn Lundy Martin's Discipline
Dodie Bellamy and Kevin Killian's Writers Who Love Too Much: New Narrative Writing 1977–1997
Édouard Glissant's Sun of Consciousness
Etel Adnan's Shifting the Silence
Fanny Howe's Radical Love: Five Novels
Gabriel Ojeda-Sagué's Oil and Candle
Herve Guibert's My Manservant and Me 
imogen xtian smith's stemmy things
Jackie Wang's The Sunflower Cast a Spell to Save Us from the Void
Kay Gabriel's A Queen in Bucks County
Lou Sullivan, Ellis Martin, and Zach Ozm's We Both Laughed in Pleasure: The Selected Diaries of Lou Sullivan
Mark Hyatt's So Much for Life
Martine Syms and Rocket Caleshu's The African Desperate
Nathanaël's Pasolini’s Our
Paolo Javier's O.B.B.
Rosie Stockton's Permanent Volta
Wayne Koestenbaum's Ultramarine, The Pink Trance Notebooks, and Ultramarine

References

External links 
 Nightboat Books Website
 UPNE > Nightboat Books Publisher Page
 Poets and Writers Nightboat Books Page

Book publishing companies based in New York (state)
Non-profit organizations based in Brooklyn
Poetry publishers
Publishing companies established in 2003